is a Japanese football player who plays for SC Sagamihara from 2023.

Club career
Yamashita was born in Ibaraki Prefecture on May 11, 2000. He joined J1 League club Vegalta Sendai from youth team in 2018. He debut in J. League Cup Group Stage Matchweek 4 against Albirex Niigata on 18 April at same year.

Yamashita enter to Takushoku University in 2019 until he was graduation in 2022.

On 25 October 2022, Yamashita joined first professional career with J3 club, SC Sagamihara for upcoming 2023 season.

Career statistics

Club
.

Notes

References

External links

2000 births
Living people
Association football people from Ibaraki Prefecture
Japanese footballers
J1 League players
J3 League players
Vegalta Sendai players
SC Sagamihara players
Association football defenders